Japanese football in 1940.

Emperor's Cup

National team

Results

Players statistics

Births
March 14 - Masahiro Hamazaki
May 28 - Hiroshi Katayama
June 25 - Shozo Tsugitani
December 26 - Teruki Miyamoto

Deaths

External links

 
Seasons in Japanese football